The Holt Gas-Electric Tank was the first prototype tank built in the United States in a collaboration between the Holt Manufacturing Company (now Caterpillar Inc.) and the General Electric Company. The tank, built during 1917-1918, was the only one of its kind built, as testing proved it lacked the agility and maneuverability required. The crew number is often given as six, on the assumption there would be two machine gunners, a gunner and loader for the main gun, a driver and a  commander.

Construction
The tank was based on a lengthened and modified version of the suspension of the Holt Model 75, with pivoting track frames. There were ten road wheels at each side. The vehicle had a Holt , 4-cylinder engine fitted with a General Electric generator driving an electric motor for each track; a comparable petro-electric system had earlier been used for the French Saint-Chamond that also was fitted with a lengthened Holt suspension. To prevent overheating the transmission—a constant problem with electrical types—a complicated water cooling system had been installed.

Weapon systems
Like the French tank, the Holt Gas-Electric had a 75 mm gun placed low in the V-shaped nose; two removable Browning 7.62 mm machine guns in sponsons on each side. The engine and transmission were in the rear, next to a corridor leading to the only door.

References

External links

 The  Holt Gas-Electric Tank
 Holt Gas-Electric Tank

World War I tanks
Tanks of the United States
Abandoned military projects of the United States
Trial and research tanks of the United States
Caterpillar Inc. vehicles
Holt Manufacturing Company
History of the tank